The tragedy of the anticommons is a type of coordination breakdown, in which a commons does not emerge, even when general access to resources or infrastructure would be a social good. It is a mirror-image of the older concept of tragedy of the commons, in which numerous rights holders' combined use exceeds the capacity of a resource and depletes or destroys it. The "tragedy of the anticommons" covers a range of coordination failures, including patent thickets and submarine patents. Overcoming these breakdowns can be difficult, but there are assorted means, including eminent domain, laches, patent pools, or other licensing organizations.

The term originally appeared in Michael Heller's 1998 article of the same name and is the thesis of his 2008 book.  The model was formalized by James M. Buchanan and Yong Yoon. In a 1998 Science article, Heller and Rebecca S. Eisenberg, while not disputing the role of patents in general in motivating invention and disclosure, argue that biomedical research was one of several key areas where competing patent rights could actually prevent useful and affordable products from reaching the marketplace.

Examples

In early aviation, the Wright brothers held patents on certain aspects of aircraft, while Glenn Curtiss held patents on ailerons which was an advance on the Wrights' system, but antipathy between the patent holders prevented their use. The government was forced to step in and create a patent pool during World War I.

In his 1998 Harvard Law Review article, Michael Heller noted that there were a lot of open air kiosks but also a lot of empty stores in many Eastern European cities after the fall of Communism. Upon investigation, he concluded that it was difficult or even impossible for a startup retailer to negotiate successfully for the use of that space because many different agencies and private parties had rights over the use of store space. Even though all the persons with ownership rights were losing money with the empty stores, and stores were in great demand, competing interests got in the way.

Heller says that the rise of the "robber barons" in medieval Germany was the result of the tragedy of the anticommons. Nobles commonly attempted to collect tolls on stretches of the Rhine passing by or through their fiefs, building towers alongside the river and stretching iron chains to prevent boats from carrying cargo up and down the river without paying a fee. Repeated attempts by the Holy Roman Empire, including several over the centuries by the Emperor, to regulate toll collection on the Rhine failed. And it was not until the establishment of the "Rhine League" of the Emperor with certain nobles and clergy that the "Robber barons" control over the Rhine was crushed. River tolls on the Rhine, increasingly imposed by states rather than individual lords, remained a sticking point in relations and commerce in the Rhine basin until the establishment of the Central Commission for Navigation on the Rhine in 1815.

Heller and Rebecca S. Eisenberg are academic law professors who believe that biological patents create a "tragedy of the anticommons", "in which people underuse scarce resources because too many owners can block each other."  Others claim that patents have not created this "anticommons" effect on research, based on surveys of scientists.

See also

References

Further reading
 Rose, Carol M. (1986) The Comedy of the Commons: Commerce, Custom and Inherently Public Property, 53 University of Chicago Law Review 711, reprinted as chapter 5 in: Rose, Carol M., Property and persuasion: Essays on the history, theory and rhetoric of ownership, Westview Press 1994

External links
 Heller's talk in the Authors@Google series
 

Anticommons
Game theory
Market failure
Property
Public commons